William Kaye (February 13, 1813 – November 19, 1890) was the fifteenth Mayor of Louisville, Kentucky from April 4, 1863, to April 1, 1865.

Early life
William Kaye was born on February 9, 1813, in Fornley, Tyas Moor, Yorkshire, England. His father was a clothing manufacturer, trained as a machinist, and came to Louisville in 1836.

Career
In 1841 he founded Kaye & Co., which was well known for its brass and bell works, including the bell in the Cathedral of the Assumption.

In 1862 he was elected as a Democrat to the City Council, He was elected as Chief of Police. On April 4, 1863, he was elected mayor over former mayor Thomas H. Crawford, who ran on the Unionist platform. Kaye was not an open supporter of the Confederacy, but he was backed by some secessionists.

After his term as mayor, he served again on the City Council.

Personal life
Kaye married Mary Pattison of Chillicothe, Ohio in 1839. Kaye died on November 19, 1890, at his boarding house in Louisville of heart failure and is buried in Cave Hill Cemetery.

See also
Louisville in the American Civil War

References

External links

1813 births
1890 deaths
Mayors of Louisville, Kentucky
People of Kentucky in the American Civil War
19th-century American politicians
Burials at Cave Hill Cemetery